Verónica Boquete Giadans (born 9 April 1987) is a Spanish professional footballer who plays as a forward or midfielder for Italian Serie A club Fiorentina. As well as in her native Spain, she has played professionally for clubs in the United States, Russia, Sweden, France, Germany, China, and Italy. She captained the Spain national team at their first World Cup appearance in 2015 and has also captained the Galicia national team for their entire history.

Club career
Boquete came to wider international attention after signing for Philadelphia Independence of the American Women's Professional Soccer (WPS) in 2011. She was a key player in Independence's 2011 season with four match-winning goals, and she was awarded the Player of the Year Award. In addition, she had been awarded the Player of the Week prize three times.

Boquete previously played for Xuventú Aguiño in her home region of Galicia, followed by Prainsa Zaragoza and RCD Espanyol in Spain, and Buffalo Flash (W-League) and Chicago Red Stars (WPS) in the summer of 2010. With Espanyol she won two national cups. She was the top scorer of the 2010–11 Superliga Femenina with 39 goals. Following the end of the 2011 WPS season she played for Russian side Energiya Voronezh in the Champions League.

In January 2012 Boquete announced a transfer to Swedish Damallsvenskan club Tyresö FF on a two-year contract. Tyresö won the Damallsvenskan title for the first time in the 2012 season and she collected a league winner's medal alongside teammates Marta and Caroline Seger, who had also played in WPS.

On 7 April 2014, Portland Thorns FC acquired Boquete (along with midfielder Sarah Huffman) from the Western New York Flash in exchange for Courtney Wetzel, Kathryn Williamson, and Portland's first-round pick in the 2015 NWSL College Draft. Western New York originally held her NWSL rights. She joined the Thorns following Tyresö's participation in the 2013-2014 UEFA Women's Champions League tournament, making her first appearance for the Thorns on 7 June 2014 versus the Western New York Flash. She scored her first goal for the Thorns on 15 June 2014 versus the Washington Spirit. She would go on to score four goals along with six assists in her 15 total appearances for the Thorns, culminating with the team's semi-final loss against FC Kansas City on 23 August 2014. During her time in Portland, she would garner the league's Player of the Week award three times.

On 25 August 2014, following the conclusion of the Portland Thorns season, Boquete signed with 1. FFC Frankfurt, the 2014 runners-up in the Frauen-Bundesliga. She expressed her desire to return to Portland in the future, "I'm going to try to do my best in Germany and I hope that I can come back (to Portland) next year, too."

On 27 May 2015, Boquete signed for the Bundesliga champions, Bayern Munich, on a two-year contract. After a season truncated by injury, she was signed by big-spending French club Paris Saint-Germain, who hoped she could help them win the UEFA Women's Champions League.

In February 2018 Boquete became dissatisfied with her reduced playing time and agreed a mutual termination on the final months of her Paris Saint-Germain contract, to accept a transfer offer from Beijing BG Phoenix. She signed a one-season deal with the Chinese club and was given her customary number 21 jersey.

On 4 January 2019, Boquete announced her signing to the Utah Royals FC of the National Women's Soccer League. She was named to the NWSL Team of the Month for May 2019.

On 6 January 2022, Boquete joined Fiorentina on a deal until the end of the season.

International career

Boquete is a veteran of Spain's 2004 UEFA Women's Under-19 Championship title win and their subsequent 2004 FIFA U-19 Women's World Championship campaign.

Boquete's senior Spain women's national football team debut came in February 2005, in a 0–0 friendly draw with the Netherlands.

In October 2012 Boquete scored the winning extra time goal in the 122nd minute of Spain's 3–2 win over Scotland in the second leg of the UEFA Women's Euro 2013 qualifying play-off. The Spanish looked to be heading out when she had missed a penalty three minutes earlier. With this goal, Boquete qualified Spain for their first UEFA Women's Euro since 1997.

In June 2013, national team coach Ignacio Quereda confirmed Boquete as a member of his 23-player squad for the UEFA Women's Euro 2013 finals in Sweden. She became captain ahead of Spain's first-ever appearance at the Women's World Cup in 2015 in Canada. In the final group game against South Korea at Lansdowne Stadium in Ottawa, both teams were playing for a place in the last 16; she opened the scoring although Spain was unable to hold the lead and lost 2–1.

Boquete had a prominent role in the player revolt which led to the departure of long-serving coach Quereda following the poor performance at the World Cup. Boquete was eventually phased out after the player revolt alongside Spain's other captains, and two years later she was surprisingly and controversially omitted from Spain's squad for UEFA Women's Euro 2017 by replacement coach Jorge Vilda. After being left out of the Euro squad, Boquete was never chosen to play for Spain again and has effectively retired from national team duty. In an interview with The Daily Telegraph, Boquete said "I know my time with the national team is over, and I know it's not because my football."

On 28 October 2021, Boquete was featured in an Movistar+ documentary called Romper El Silencio, where she detailed her experiences while playing in the Spanish national team under Quereda. Boquete, alongside former teammates Vicky Losada, Natalia Pablos, and Mar Prieto, claimed in the documentary that Quereda was psychologically abusive, vocally homophobic, controlling, and that he created a toxic playing environment.

International goals

Personal life
In June 2013 Boquete became the first Spanish female footballer to release an autobiography. Entitled Vero Boquete, la princesa del deporte rey (Vero Boquete, the princess of the king sport), it was written by Marca writer David Menayo.

Successful FIFA video game women's petition
In 2013, Boquete started a petition on Change.org, which called upon video game producer Electronic Arts to introduce female players in its FIFA series and attracted 20,000 signatures in 24 hours. The petition was eventually successful, as EA Sports revealed in May 2015 that she and the rest of Spain would join 11 other female international teams (Australia, Brazil, Canada, China, England, France, Germany, Italy, Mexico, Sweden and the United States) in FIFA 16, which was released in September 2015 (on the 22nd in North America and the 24th in Europe) for the PlayStation 3, PlayStation 4, Xbox 360, Xbox One and also on Windows PC.

Estadio Verónica Boquete
On 8 November 2018, the city hall of Santiago de Compostela agreed to rename their main stadium to Estadio Verónica Boquete de San Lázaro, in recognition of Boquete.

Honours

 RCD Espanyol
 Copa de la Reina de Fútbol: 2009, 2010

 Tyresö FF
 Damallsvenskan: 2012

 FFC Frankfurt
 UEFA Women's Champions League:  2014–15

 Bayern München
 Bundesliga: 2015–16
 Spain
 UEFA Women's Under-19 Championship: 2004
 Algarve Cup: 2017
Individual

 WPS Michelle Akers Player of the Year: 2011
 Primera División Golden Boot: 2010–11
 WPS Best XI: 2011

 UEFA Women's Championship All-Star Team: 2013
FIFA FIFPro Women's World11: 2020
NWSL Team of the Month: May 2019

References

External links

 
 
 Rfef.es
 Player Damallsvenskan stats  at SvFF
Player German domestic football stats  at DFB
 Profile  at FFC Frankfurt
 Profile  at RCD Espanyol
 Profile  at Bayern Munich
 
 La Voz de Galicia 
 Philadelphia Independence
 Profile at Footofeminin.fr 

1987 births
Living people
Footballers from Santiago de Compostela
Women's Professional Soccer players
Women's association football midfielders
Women's association football forwards
Spanish women's footballers
Spain women's youth international footballers
Spain women's international footballers
Chicago Red Stars players
Philadelphia Independence players
Tyresö FF players
FC Energy Voronezh players
RCD Espanyol Femenino players
1. FFC Frankfurt players
FC Bayern Munich (women) players
Paris Saint-Germain Féminine players
Zaragoza CFF players
Beijing BG Phoenix F.C. players
Portland Thorns FC players
Utah Royals FC players
A.C. Milan Women players
Fiorentina Women's F.C. players
Damallsvenskan players
Primera División (women) players
Division 1 Féminine players
National Women's Soccer League players
Serie A (women's football) players
Spanish expatriate footballers
Expatriate women's soccer players in the United States
Spanish expatriate sportspeople in the United States
Expatriate women's footballers in Russia
Spanish expatriate sportspeople in Russia
Expatriate women's footballers in Germany
Spanish expatriate sportspeople in Germany
Expatriate women's footballers in France
Spanish expatriate sportspeople in France
Expatriate women's footballers in China
Spanish expatriate sportspeople in China
Expatriate women's footballers in Italy
Spanish expatriate sportspeople in Italy
2015 FIFA Women's World Cup players
Castelao Medal recipients